Scilla verna, commonly known as spring squill, is a flowering plant native to Western Europe. It belongs to the squill genus Scilla. Its star-like blue flowers are produced during the spring.

It is a small plant, usually reaching 5-15 centimetres in height. It is perennial and grows from a bulb which is 10-15 millimetres across and ovoid in shape. Two to seven leaves grow from the base of the plant; they are long and narrow, measuring 3–20 cm by 2–5 mm. The flowers grow in a dense cluster of two to twelve at the top of the upright stem. They are scentless and have six violet-blue tepals, 5–8 mm long. Each flower has a 5–15 mm long, bluish bract at the base. The seeds are ovoid and black. The diploid number of chromosomes is 20 or 22.

The plant occurs from Portugal north through Spain, France, Great Britain (particularly the west coast) and Ireland (mainly along the east coast), reaching as far as the Faroe Islands and Norway. It is found in short dry grassy areas, usually near the sea. It is one of the key components of the H7 plant community in the British National Vegetation Classification system. It was chosen as the county flower for County Down in Northern Ireland after a public vote organised by the charity Plantlife in 2002.

References

Stace, Clive A. (1997) New Flora of the British Isles. Cambridge University Press.
Tutin, T. G. et al. (1980) Flora Europaea, Volume 5. Cambridge University Press.

External links

 Distribution of Scilla verna in Britain and Ireland

verna
Flora of Europe

nl:Scilla pratensis